is an active volcano located on the southern border of Akita and Yamagata in the Tōhoku region of Japan, and is  tall. In addition to being one of the 100 Famous Landscapes of Japan, it is also included as one of the 100 famous mountains in Japan, and famous 100 Geographical Features of Japan. It is surrounded by Chōkai Quasi-National Park. It is also a National Historic Site of Japan, and is regarded as a sacred mountain by followers of the Shugendō branch of Shinto and is popular with hikers.

Outline
Mount Chōkai is a complex stratovolcano  made of two old and new newer volcanoes, composed primarily of  basalt or andesite.

Mount Chōkai is shared by two municipalities in Akita Prefecture and four municipalities Yamagata Prefecture; however, its peak is located in Yuza, on the Yamagata side of the border. It is therefore the highest peak in Yamagata, and the second highest in the Tōhoku region after  Mt. Hiuchigatake (altitude 2,356 m). The highest elevation of Mount Chōkai within Akita Prefecture has an altitude of  1,775 meters, and thus the mountain is also the highest in Akita Prefecture. From the summit, it is possible to see the Shirakami Mountains and Mount Iwaki to the north, Sado Island to the south and the Pacific Ocean to the east.

On the south side of the mountain is “Kokoro Yukikei,” where snow remains in the shape of the kanji for  “heart” in even in summer, and portions of the summit have perennial snow, and geological evidence of glaciation in the recent past. 

Indigenous species of Mount Chōkai include the butterfly thistle and butterfly fish.

Eruptions
Mount Chōkai is a very active mountain. Known major eruptions occurred:

466 B.C. Causes massive collapse of mountain peak (based on dendrochronology)
810 AD  Records of eruption continue to 824.
840 AD  Eruption.
871 AD  Eruption and lava flow with Volcanic explosion index: VEI 2
939 AD  Eruption
1560 AD Eruption
1659-1663 AD Eruptions
1740-1741 AD Eruption 
1800-1801 AD Steam explosion, lava flow, formation of a new lava dome:  Eight people killed 821 Eruption recorded.
1834 AD Eruption
1971 AD Eruption
1974 AD Steam explosion, small mud flow; Volcanic Explosion Index: VEI 1

History
Mount Chōkai has been the object of mountain worship since ancient times. From the Heian period, it gradually became a training ground for Shugendō, as an avatar of Yakushi Nyorai. From the south was a pilgrimage path to the summit. In the middle of the Edo period the mountain drew many pilgrims and had 33 chapels at its base., with additional routes to its summit opened in the north. There is also a tradition that the island of Tobishima in the Sea of Japan was originally a part of the summit of Mount Chokai.

Three ships have been named after Mount Chōkai: Chōkai, an early steam gunboat, and the cruiser  (sunk in 1944), which were both in the Imperial Japanese Navy, and the JDS Chōkai, a Kongō class guided missile destroyer currently in service in the Japan Maritime Self-Defense Force.

See also
List of volcanoes in Japan

References

External links
 Chokaisan - Japan Meteorological Agency 
   - Japan Meteorological Agency
 Chokaisan - Smithsonian Institution: Global Volcanism Program
Tohoku Tourism home page
https://www.thehiddenjapan.com/mtchokai - English Information 

Mountains of Akita Prefecture
Mountains of Yamagata Prefecture
Volcanoes of Akita Prefecture
Volcanoes of Yamagata Prefecture
Volcanoes of Honshū
Stratovolcanoes of Japan
Active volcanoes
Historic Sites of Japan
Two-thousanders of Asia
Pleistocene stratovolcanoes
Holocene stratovolcanoes